Na Phu railway station is a railway station located in Na Phu Subdistrict, Phen District, Udon Thani Province. Na Phu was originally a railway station built a long time ago, but it was closed down in the 1980s. The station was rebuilt and reopened on 16 March 2015.

References 

Railway stations in Thailand
Udon Thani province